Chisholm Trail High School is a public high school in Fort Worth, Texas. It is administered by the Eagle Mountain-Saginaw Independent School District and classified as a 6A school by the UIL.  The school opened in August 2012 with 938 freshmen and sophomores, and expanded to grades nine through twelve by the 2014–15 school year.

The school takes its name from the historic Chisholm Trail cattle drive route, which passed through Fort Worth.

Athletics 
The school won its first Football homecoming game on August 26, 2016 with a score of 46-0 and ended the season with a record of 4-6

References

External links
School Website
Athletic Website

Eagle Mountain-Saginaw Independent School District high schools
Public high schools in Fort Worth, Texas